Bar Royal Palace is a (former) royal summer residence in Bar, Montenegro. The palace was constructed by king Nikola I Petrović-Njegoš in 1885, and was a gift to his daughter Princess Zorka and his son-in-law, Prince Petar Karađorđević. The complex includes the large and the small palace, a chapel, houses for the guards and a winter garden. A spacious ballroom was added in 1910.
 
At the front of the palace, there was a wooden pier. Between 1866 and 1916, King Nikola owned ten yachts. One of them, Sibil, was bought from Jules Verne, the novelist. The last yacht bought was the Rumija. In 1915, it was sunk in the Bar harbour by the Austro-Hungarian navy. 

Currently, the palace houses the city museum of Bar. Also, it is used as a venue for festivals, concerts, exhibitions and literary events.

References

Bar, Montenegro
Palaces in Montenegro
Royal residences in Montenegro